Bethune, or Béthune, is a French and Scottish surname. It originates from the name of the town of Béthune in Pas-de-Calais, Nord-Pas-de-Calais, France. The name of the town was first recorded in the 8th century, in the Latin form Bitunia. The surname is first recorded in Scotland during the reign of King Alexander II (4 December 1214 to 8 July 1249) when charters of the abbeys of St Andrews and Arbroath name Robert de Betunia, probably a knight , Sir David de Betun, definitely a knight, and John de Betun, probably a cleric.

List of persons with the surname
 Ade Bethune (1914–2002), American Catholic artist
 Alexander Bethune (disambiguation), various people
 Angus Bethune (politician) (1908–2004), Premier of Tasmania
 Angus Bethune (fur trader) (1783–1858), North West Company fur trader
 Charles Bethune (1802–1884), Royal Navy admiral
 David Bethune (–1546), Cardinal Archbishop of St Andrews
 David Lindesay-Bethune, 15th Earl of Lindsay (1926–1989)
 Donald Bethune (1802–1869), Canadian judge and politician
 Eberhard of Béthune, Flemish grammarian
 Ed Bethune (born 1935), American politician
 Edith Hallett Bethune (1890–1970), Canadian photographer
 Edward Cecil Bethune (1955–1930), British Army officer
 Elizabeth Bethune, mistress of James V of Scotland
 Emmanuel de Bethune (1930–2011), Belgian politician
 George Bethune (disambiguation), various people
 Gordon Bethune (born 1941), American airline executive
 Henry Bethune (disambiguation), various people
 James Bethune (disambiguation), various people
 Janet Beaton or Bethune (1519–1569), Scottish aristocrat accused of being a witch
 Jean-Baptiste Bethune (1821–1894), Belgian architect
 Jeanne de Béthune, Viscountess of Meaux (-1450)
 Joanna Bethune (1770–1860), Scottish-Canadian philanthropist
 John Bethune (disambiguation), various people
 Joseph D. Bethune (1842–1913), American jurist
 Lauchlin Bethune (1785–1874), American politician
 Louise Blanchard Bethune (1856–1913), American architect
 Margaret Bethune (1820–1887), Scottish midwife
 Marion Bethune (1816–1895), American politician
 Mary Bethune (disambiguation), various people
 Matilda of Béthune (died 1264), countess of Flanders
 Maximilien de Béthune, Duke of Sully (1560–1641), French nobleman and counselor of Henry IV of France
 Norman Bethune (1890–1939), Canadian physician and Communist revolutionary
 Norman Bethune Sr. (1822–1892), Canadian physician
 Patricia Bethune (born 1956), American actress
 Pete Bethune (born 1965), New Zealand environmentalist
 Phyllis Bethune (1899–1982), New Zealand artist
 Reginald Lindesay-Bethune, 12th Earl of Lindsay (1867–1939)
 Robert de Bethune (died 1148), English bishop
 Robert Henry Bethune (1836–1895), Canadian banker
 Rupe Bethune (1917–1984), Australian rules footballer
 Sabine de Bethune (born 1958), Belgian politician
 Tim Bethune (born 1962), Canadian sprinter
 Zina Bethune (1945–2012), American actress, dancer, and choreographer

References

See also 
 Beaton (surname)
 Bethune baronets
 Clan Bethune
 House of Béthune

English-language surnames
French-language surnames
Scottish surnames
Toponymic surnames